The following is a list of pipeline accidents in the United States in 1980. It is one of several lists of U.S. pipeline accidents. See also: list of natural gas and oil production accidents in the United States.

Incidents 

This is not a complete list of all pipeline accidents. For natural gas alone, the Pipeline and Hazardous Materials Safety Administration (PHMSA), a United States Department of Transportation agency, has collected data on more than 3,200 accidents deemed serious or significant since 1987.

A "significant incident" results in any of the following consequences:
 Fatality or injury requiring in-patient hospitalization.
 $50,000 or more in total costs, measured in 1984 dollars.
 Liquid releases of five or more barrels (42 US gal/barrel).
 Releases resulting in an unintentional fire or explosion.

PHMSA and the National Transportation Safety Board (NTSB) post-incident data and results of investigations into accidents involving pipelines that carry a variety of products, including natural gas, oil, diesel fuel, gasoline, kerosene, jet fuel, carbon dioxide, and other substances. Occasionally pipelines are re-purposed to carry different products.

The following incidents occurred during 1980:

 1980 On January 2, crude oil leaked from a fractured 22-inch pipeline, at a levee crossing, in Berwick, Louisiana. At 9:54 a.m., the crude oil ignited. One person was killed, one person was injured, and six homes were either destroyed, or, damaged. A defective sleeve weld cause the pipeline to fail.
Gasoline from the rupture sprayed downhill, and ran off into a small creek. About  hours later, the gasoline vapors were ignited by an undetermined source and exploded; the subsequent fire killed one person and extensively damaged 25 houses and other property.
 1980 On February 21, an explosion and fire destroyed four stores in a shopping complex and severely damaged an adjoining restaurant in Cordele, Georgia. Of the eight persons who were injured, three died later as a result of their injuries. Property damage was extensive. The NTSB investigation of the accident has revealed that natural gas leaked from a 1-inch steel service line, which had been pulled from a 1-inch compression coupling from a backhoe working in the area, and migrated under a concrete slab floor and into a jewelry store where it was ignited by an unknown source.
 1980 A Colonial Pipeline Dispatcher ignored established procedures for dealing with a pressure surge, causing a double rupture of a 32-inch steel petroleum products pipeline on March 6. Before being fully contained, the kerosene had flowed into Bull Run River, and had entered the Occoquan Reservoir, a source of drinking water for several northern Virginia communities. Before being fully contained, the fuel oil had flowed into the Rapidan River and then into the Rappahannock River, a source of drinking water for the City of Fredericksburg.
 1980 Sabotage during a labor strike was suspected in a gasoline pipeline explosion in Marcus Hook, Pennsylvania on March 7. The following fire burned for about 17 hours.
 1980 On April 16, gasoline at a Williams Companies pipeline terminal in Roseville, Minnesota, sprayed from the fractured cast-iron base of a station booster pump at 72 psig pressure, vaporized, and exploded after it was ignited by the spark of an electric switch in the mainline pump control room  downwind of the booster pump. One man was killed, 3 others injured, and extensive damage was done to the terminal. About  of petroleum products burned and property damage was estimated at $3 million.
 1980 On May 27, near Cartwright, Louisiana, an anhydrous ammonia pipeline was struck by a bulldozer, which was being used to prepare a well site, and the pipeline ruptured. Over 100 people were evacuated from the area.
 1980 On July 23, a Tennessee Gas Pipeline 30 inch line burst in Clay City, Kentucky, spraying dirt and rocks in the area, damaging 2 homes. There was no fire.
 1980 A road grader ruptured an NGL pipeline in Aurora, Colorado on August 11. Firefighters had barely evacuated residents in the area when the vapors exploded, burning one firefighter.
 1980 On September 3, a Mid-Valley Pipeline Co. line was ruptured by pipeline work, in Cygnet, Ohio. Efforts to contain the crude were unable to prevent some of it from entering the Portage River.
 1980 An oil pipeline ruptured and burned while it was being repaired at an oil storage Terminal in Piney Point, Maryland on September 12, 1980. One worker was killed, and 5 others injured in the fire.
 1980 On October 9, a 2-inch compression coupling located on the upstream side of a gas meter set assembly in the boiler room of the Simon Kenton High School in Independence, Kentucky, pulled out of its connection with a 2-inch gas service line. Natural gas at 165-psig pressure escaped through the 2-inch opening and, seconds later, exploded and burned. A basement wall was blown down, an adjacent classroom was damaged, and one student was killed. About 30 minutes later, a second explosion occurred, which injured 37 persons and extensively damaged the school. The gas main was being uprated at the time.
 1980 A bulldozer digging a ditch for a new pipeline hit a 16-inch crude oil pipeline near San Ysidro, New Mexico on October 22. The operator was fatally burned.
 1980 On November 17, a one-inch connector on a sour gas gathering pipeline broke near Malakoff, Texas. 12 families were evacuated for a time.
 1980 A pipeline carrying naphtha ruptured under a street in Long Beach, California, causing a fire that destroyed one home and damaged several others. Two people were injured. Lack of communication of pipeline valve setups, and pressure relief valves set to open at too high a pressure were identified by the NTSB as causes of the accident. (December 1, 1980)
 1980 On December 4, installation of a new pipeline affected a propane pipeline, that then burst & ignited, near Spivey, Kansas. 4 workers had minor injuries.
 1980 A dirt pan machine being used for road construction hit a propane pipeline in Sumner, Georgia on December 10, causing slight injuries to the dirt pan operator. US Highway 82 and a rail line were closed, and several families evacuated until the vapors dispersed. There was no fire.
 1980 On December 22, a pipeline carrying jet fuel ruptured in Las Vegas, Nevada, spilling fuel for 2 hours. Later, the fuel ignited, forcing road closures. One firefighter was overcome by fumes. Prior construction in the area was suspected of damaging the pipeline.
 1980 A Southern California Edison pipeline ruptured in Carson, California on December 23, spilling about 105,000 gallons of crude oil, with some of it reaching the Dominguez Channel.
 1980 A natural gas pipeline exploded and burned at a gas plant in Ulysses, Kansas on December 28. There were no injuries

References

Lists of pipeline accidents in the United States